Thomas Sulman (c.1834 – 1900) was an English architectural draftsman.

Sulman studied at The Working Men's College between 1854 and 1858, where he was a student of, and later an engraver for, Dante Gabriel Rossetti; he was influenced by the positivist thinkers at the college.

He became a specialist in using balloons to produce birds-eye views of cities including London, Oxford, Glasgow and New York City. These views, as hand-coloured engravings produced with the help of London engraver Robert Loudan Sr., were featured in The Illustrated London News from the 1860s, and were sometimes produced to a fold-out six foot length.

Sulman drew and engraved images for newspaper and magazine advertisements, including one for Beethams Glycerine and Cucumber showing a young woman with toiletries. He illustrated for The Boy’s Own Annual in the 1880s.

References

1830s births
1900 deaths
19th-century engravers
English engravers